The Brexit Alliance was a British political technical group formed on 12 December 2018 by Peter Whittle and David Kurten. They were elected to the London Assembly in 2016 as UK Independence Party (UKIP) representatives, but when Whittle announced he was leaving the party, the new group was formed. This was because to qualify as a group on the Assembly, at least two members are needed.

Kurten subsequently also left UKIP in January 2020 while remaining in the Brexit Alliance.

The Brexit Alliance lost both seats they held on the London Assembly at the 2021 London Assembly election.

External links
 Official site

References

Political parties established in 2018
Eurosceptic parties in the United Kingdom
Political parties in England
Political history of London
2018 establishments in England
UK Independence Party breakaway groups
Political parties disestablished in 2021
2021 disestablishments in England